The Lloyd Historic District is a U.S. historic district (designated as such on September 5, 1991) located in Lloyd, Florida. The district runs roughly along Main Street north of Bond Street and Bond east of Main. It contains 18 buildings.

On June 27, 2002, a decrease in the district's boundary was implemented.

References

National Register of Historic Places in Jefferson County, Florida
Historic districts on the National Register of Historic Places in Florida
Vernacular architecture in Florida